The Core district is a neighborhood of Downtown San Diego, California. The Core district is the central business district in Downtown San Diego.

Geography

This district is located in the center of the city; it is bordered to the north by Cortez Hill, to the northwest by Little Italy, to the south by the Horton District and Gaslamp Quarter, to the east by East Village and to the west by Columbia district.

References

External links
Downtown Neighborhoods Map
Downtown San Diego Core Neighborhood Information 

Neighborhoods in San Diego
Urban communities in San Diego